Speak and Destroy is an extended-play by the  American rock band Escanaba Firing Line, released on June 24, 2003. Originally recorded for demo purposes only the recording was never meant to be released to the public and was only released in low quantities.

Track listing
All songs written and performed by Escanaba Firing Line.

 "Broken Beat" – 4:12
 "Terra Incognito" – 4:02
 "Awkward Child" – 2:32
 "Moderate Rock Tempo" – 2:29
 "pinot noir" – 5:11
 "Instrumental" – 4:50
 "a little island" – 5:02
 "Talking to a Wall" – 3:23
 "Dakota" – 4:07
 "False Start" (live) – 11:56

Personnel

Escanaba Firing Line
 Ryan Younce - guitar, vocals
 Jesse Younce - Guitar, vocals
 Tony Colombo - bass, Additional vocals
 Jeremy VanSice - drums, Additional percussion, Additional vocals

Additional musicians
 S. Miller – Guest vocals

Production
 Tim Pak - engineering, mixing
 The Flying Pauleini Brothers - mixing
 Jesse Younce - art and design

References

External links
Speak and Destroy at MusicBrainz
Speak and Destroy at Last.fm

Escanaba Firing Line albums
2003 EPs